Situated in the northern part of India, bordering with the capital of India New Delhi, Uttar Pradesh is one of the most popular and an established tourist destination for both Indians and non-Indians alike in India. The most populous state of India, Uttar Pradesh contains many historical monuments and places of religious significance. Geographically, Uttar Pradesh is very diverse, with Himalayan foothills in the extreme north and the Gangetic Plain in the centre. It is also home of India's most visited sites, Hinduism's holiest city, Varanasi. Kumbh city, Prayagraj. Kathak, one of the eight forms of Indian classical dances, originated from Uttar Pradesh. Uttar Pradesh is at the heart of India, hence it is also known as The Heartland of India. Cuisine of Uttar Pradesh like Awadhi cuisine, Mughlai cuisine, Kumauni cuisine are very famous not only in India but also many places abroad and Pratapgarh is also famous for Rajputana.

Uttar Pradesh is known for its rich culture and tradition. It is home to Ayodhya and Mathura birthplace of Lord Rama, Lord Krishna and Bhgwan Parshuram respectively. Uttar Pradesh attracts many national and international tourists. Taj Mahal, one of the New Seven Wonders of the World in Agra is also located in Uttar Pradesh.

There are different places one can visit in Uttar Pradesh. Agra, Ayodhya, Jhansi, Kanpur and  Lucknow are historical cities famous for their monuments. Mathura, Vrindavan, Gokul, Varanasi, Ayodhya, Gorakhpur and Prayagraj are holy cities for Hindus and Kushinagar and Sarnath are important Buddhist places among the main four pilgrimage sites related to the life of Gautama Buddha. Noida is the most developed urban city of Uttar Pradesh.

To boost the tourism in the state from within the country and other parts of the world, the Government of Uttar Pradesh established an Uttar Pradesh Heritage Arc covering the cities of Agra, Lucknow and Varanasi.

Agra
The 17th-century Taj Mahal in Agra is the most popular monument in India, attracting over 7 million visitors per year. Agra is home to four World Heritage Sites in Taj Mahal, Agra Fort, Sikandra & the Fatehpur Sikri. Agra is also home to many other Mughal buildings like Akbar's Tomb, Itmad-Ud-Daulah etc. Dayal Bagh is an under-construction temple that many visit. The lifelike carving in marble is not seen anywhere else in India.

Hindu religious sites
Millions of tourists and pilgrims visit the cities like Prayagraj, Varanasi, Mathura, Gorakhpur, and Ayodhya, as those are considered to be the holiest cities in India.

Varanasi

Varanasi (also called Kashi and Benares) is widely considered to be the oldest city in the world,  before Jerusalem. It is famous for its ghats (steps along the river) which are populated year round with people who want to take a dip in the holy Ganges River.

Kashi Vishwanath Temple in Varanasi is home to the Vishwanath Jyotirling temple, which is one of the most sacred of Hindu Temples.

Varanasi is also famous for its cuisines, it includes food like diversity of sweets and all kinds of spicy food .

Mathura-Vrindavan
Birthplace of Lord Krishana. Both Mathura & Vrindavan have temples devoted to Krishna.  During Holi, a special form of Holi called the Lath mar Holi is played here.

Janmaashtami, the birth of Lord Krishna, is celebrated in the region.

Mathura is one of the seven most important pilgrimage sites in Hindu religion. Vrindavan, another place related to Lord Shri Krishna, is said to be twin city of Mathura. There are about more than 25 ghats out of which Vishram Ghat is most sacred where Shri Krishna rested after killing Kansa.

Ayodhya
Hindus believe the birthplace of Lord Rama to be in Ayodhya at the place called Ram Janmabhoomi.

Ayodhya is also the birthplace of five Tirthankars, including the first Tirthankar of Jainism, Shri Rishabh Dev. He is known as the father of Jain religion. The city is also important in the history and heritage of Buddhism in India, with several Buddhist temples, monuments and centers of learning having been established here during the age of the Mauryan Empire and the Gupta Dynasty. Ayodhya reached its glorious peak as known to history during the reign of the Guptas over India.

Swaminarayan led the Swaminarayan Sampraday sect of Hinduism and lived here during his childhood years. It was from Ayodhya that Swaminarayan started his seven-year journey across India as Neelkanth.

Tulsidas is said to have begun the writing of his famous Ramayana poem Shri Ramacharitamanas in Ayodhya in 1574 CE. Several Tamil Alwar mention the city of Ayodhya. Ayodhya is also said to be the birthplace of Bahubali, Brahmi, Sundari, King Dasaratha, Acharya Padaliptasurisvarji, King Harishchandra, Shri Rama, Achalbhrata, and the ninth Gandhara of Mahavir Swami.

The Atharva Veda called Ayodhya "a city built by gods and being as prosperous as paradise itself".

Soron Shukar Kshetra is salvation land of Lord Varah and birthland of Sant Tulsidas.

Ayodhya is likely to get 5-6 crore people annually after the Ram Mandir construction is completed in 2023.

Naimisaranya
Naimisaranya also known as Neemsar, Nimsar or Nimkhar is a Hindu temple dedicated to Vishnu located in Sitapur district in the north Indian state of Uttar Pradesh. It is one of the Divya Desams, the 108 temples of Vishnu revered in Nalayira Divya Prabandham by the 12 poet saints, or Alwars. The temple is believed to be of significant antiquity with contributions at different times from the ruling kings. The temple is counted as one of the eight temples of Vishnu that self-manifested and is classified as Swayamvyaktha Kshetra. The holy tank Chankra Kunda is associated with the temple and it is a pilgrimage centre where people take a holy dip during festive occasions.

Prayagraj

Every year thousands gather at Allahabad to take part in the festival on the banks of the Ganges, the Magh Mela. The same festival is organised in a larger scale every 12th year and attracts millions of people and is called the Kumbha Mela. Kumbh Mela (especially the Maha Kumbh Mela) is the most sacred of all the pilgrimages. Thousands of holy men and women (monks, saints and sadhus) attend, and the auspiciousness of the festival is in part attributable to this. The sadhus are seen clad in saffron sheets with plenty of ashes and powder dabbed on their skin per the requirements of ancient traditions. Some called Nanga sanyasis or Dhigambers may often be seen without any clothes even in severe winter, generally considered to live an extreme lifestyle. This tends to attract a lot of western attention as it is seemingly in contrast to a generally conservative social modesty practised in the country.

Buddhist religious sites
Uttar Pradesh has many sites which are connected to Lord Buddha and hence, are sacred to Buddhist.
 Sarnath: a place where he held his first public discourse. Also at Sarnath is the Ashoka Pillar with the Lion Capital, is important archaeological artifact with national significance.
 Kushinagar: Where he attained Mahaparinirvana (Demise).
 Kaushambi: Where Buddha delivered many sermons.
 Sankassa: Where he descended after addressing his mother in Heaven.
 Sravasti: His favorite monsoon resort.

Jain religious sites

Parshvanatha, the twenty-third Tirthankara, was born in Benaras (now Varanasi) in 872 BCE. According to Jain tradition, Kashi (now Varanasi) is the birthplace of three more Tirthankaras, namely Suparshvanatha, Chandraprabha and Shreyansanatha.

According to Jain tradition, five tirthankaras were born at Ayodhya, including Rishabhanatha, 
Ajitanatha, Abhinandananatha, Sumatinatha and Anantanatha.

Uttar Pradesh has many sites which are connected to Jainism and hence, are sacred to Jains.
 Jain temple, Deogarh is a complex of 31 Jain temples built inside fort belonging to 8th-9th century. 
 Hastinapur is believed to be birthplace of Shantinatha, Kunthunatha and Aranatha.
 Ahichchhatra is place where Parshvanatha attained Kevala Jnana.
 Sarnath Jain Tirth is believed to be birthplace of Shreyansnath.
 Varansi is believed to be birthplace of Suparshvanatha and Parshvanatha.
 Shobhnath temple, Shravasti is believed to be birthplace of Sambhavanatha.
 Shouripur is believed to be birthplace of Neminatha.
 Bada Gaon
 Navagarh Tirth
 Bundelkhand, in the heart of India, has been an ancient centre of Jainism. It is mostly in modern Madhya Pradesh, but part of it is in Uttar Pradesh.

Places of interest

Places of interest in Uttar Pradesh include:
 Varanasi – The origin of Hinduism and the oldest city of the world, also known as City of temples, holy place for devotees of Lord Shiva, one of the finest Textiles Industry in the world.

 Agra – Taj Mahal and several others historical monuments and gardens.
 Ambedkar Nagar - Historical places from ancient India to modern India and India's fastest growing Industrial city .
 Prayagraj – Well known for its Kumbh Mela. The place where Indian national river Ganges and Yamuna and Saraswati rivers meet. A mass Hindu pilgrimage in which Hindus gather at the Ganges river. Akbar forts, one of the most popular religious center of ancient and modern India for Hinduism. Uttar Pradesh's administrative and education capital.

Allahabad museum - is a National-level museum in Prayagraj Uttar Pradesh
 Kanpur – Uttar Pradesh's commercial and Industrial hub, several historical places from British era and an ancient brick temple at Bhitargaon.
 Lucknow – The capital of Uttar Pradesh, Several historical places Nawab, British and ancient India.
 Mathura-The birthplace of Lord Krishna of Hinduism and Neminath of Jainism.
 Vrindavan
 Ayodhya – The birthplace of Lord Vishnu's incarnation prabhu Shri Rama.
 Jhansi – Historical place, Rani Lakshmibai's battlefield against British, Jhansi Fort.
 Bareilly—A large city of Uttar Pradesh with many attractions such as Banke Bihari Temple, Hari Temple, Ala Hazrat, and Gandhi Udhayan. The jhumka style of music is associated with Bareilly.
 Sarnath-Gautama Buddha first taught the Dharma, the Buddha as one of the four places of pilgrimage which his devout followers should visit. The birthplace of Shreyansanath, the eleventh Jain Tirthankar of the Jainism.
 Kushinagar – It is an important Buddhist pilgrimage site, where Gautama Buddha is believed to have attained Parinirvana after his death.
 Fatehpur Sikri-Historical place for Mughal Empire's palaces and forts.

 Meerut – The historical place of the Sepoy Mutiny of 1857 or the First War of Indian Independence. Indian Historical place from Mahabharata period of ancient India to Modern Uttar Pradesh, India.
 Mirzapur Division – A hub of carpet Industries, and popular tourist destination for its natural environment.
.
 Ghaziabad – Historical places from ancient India to modern India and India's fastest growing Industrial city .
 Noida and Greater Noida – IT, Electronics and education hub of Northern India.India's biggest city with planned and iconic skyscrapers.
 Gorakhpur – The city was home to Buddhist, Hindu, Muslim, Jain and Sikh saints. The birthplace of Paramhansa Yogananda, great Hindu emperor Chandragupta Maurya. Gorakhpur is famous for Gorakhnath Temple (Gorakshnath Math), Chauri Chaura, Geeta press, Gita Vatika, Ramgarh Tal Lake, and is one of the fastest-growing cities in Uttar Pradesh.
 Jaunpur – Historical city founded by the Sultan of Delhi, Feroz Shah Tughlaq and named in memory of his father, Muhammad bin Tughluq as Jaunpur Sultanate. Mughals, Lodis and Islamic forts.
 Dudhwa National Park – Dudhwa Tiger Reserve, Birds Sanctuary, the unique Frog Temple at Oyal, Surat Bhawan Palace, Elephant Rides.
 Rehar – Several major tourist attractions can be mentioned in the town's surroundings, like Jim Corbett National Park (India) about 24 km, Nainital (India) about 69 km
 Gonda - Mulagandhakuti. The remains of Buddha's hut in Jetavana Monastery, Sravasti in Gonda Division and Swaminarayan Chhapaiyā: The village of Chhapaiya is situated at a distance of 50 km from the district headquarters. The chief interest of the place is Swaminarayan temple which marks the birthplace of Swaminarayan, or Sahajanand Swami, who was born here on 2 April 1781 as Ghanshyam Pande. Ghanshyam left Chhapaiya at the age of 11 to travel to the pilgrimage sites around India. He completed his pilgrimage in Western Gujarat, where he assumed the leadership of Swaminarayan Sampradaya. The Akshardham temples in New Delhi and in Gandhinagar, Gujarat built by his spiritual successor, Pramukh Swami Maharaj, are both dedicated to him. His followers consider him to be a manifestation of the Supreme Godhead.[10] There have been many movies about the Swaminarayan filmed in this temple in Chhapaiya and in nearby places in the district.

Wildlife

Dudhwa National Park and Dudhwa Tiger Reserve are protected areas, the tiger reserve is located in Lakhimpur Kheri district. In September 2008, Uttar Pradesh has got another tiger reserve in Pilibhit named Pilibhit Tiger Reserve. Some areas require a special permit for non-Indians to visit. Uttar Pradesh also contains several other wildlife sanctuaries, safari park and zoological parks for various species including a safari park named Etawah Safari Park in Etawah.

Pilibhit Tiger Reserve

Pilibhit Tiger Reserve is located in Pilibhit district, Mahof range of Uttar Pradesh state in India. It lies along the India-Nepal border in the foothills of the Himalayas and the plains of the 'terai' in Uttar Pradesh. It is one of India's 50 Project Tiger Tiger reserves.

Pilibhit is one of the few well-forested districts in Uttar Pradesh. According to an estimate of the year 2004, Pilibhit district has over 800 km2 (310 sq mi) forests, constituting roughly 23% of the district's total area. Forests in Pilibhit have at least a good number of tigers and a good prey base for their survival as per records and assumption there were 36 tigers in 2016–17, then counts goes up till 45 in 2017–18, and present August 2019 to November 2020 there are 65 tigers in this reserve and more. Although some illegal human residents are still present in the reserve, the government is aiming to remove them. During winter tigers could easily be seen in the countryside near forest areas. It holds a wide range of different animal and bird species.

Pilibhit forests area is a home for the striped cats, tigers, bears, and many species of birds. A proposal, created in 2005, to make a home for the endangered cats in Pilibhit forests was sent to the government of India in April 2008. Pilibhit Tiger Reserve was declared in September 2008 based on its special type of ecosystem with vast open spaces and sufficient feed for the elegant predators.

Geography of the reserve
The northeastern boundary of the reserve is the Sharda river (Nepali: Mahakali River) which defines the Indo-Nepal border, while the southwest boundary is marked by the River Sharda and the River Ghaghara. The reserve has a core zone area of 602.79 km2 (232.74 sq mi) and a buffer zone area of 127.45 km2 (49.21 sq mi). Elevation ranges from 168 to 175 meters above MSL.

Galleries

Agra

Prayagraj

Ayodhya

Fatehpur Sikri

Kanpur

Kushinagar

Lucknow

Mathura and Vrindavan

Varanasi and Sarnath

Etawah and Saifai

See also
 Orai
 List of tourist attractions in Varanasi
 List of tourist attractions in Allahabad
 UP nahi dekha toh India nahi dekha

References

External links
 Official Website of Agra maintained by NIC